Pangat (Punjabi: ਪੰਗਤ ) is a word derived from the Sanskrit word pankti (पङ्क्ति) that means a line, a row, or a group. It is a synonym for Guru Ka Langar. In a Pangat, food is served by volunteers (Sevadars) to people of all religions who sit together to eat. Pangat is about eating food while sitting in rows with no discrimination on the basis of caste, creed and religion. According to the beliefs of Sikhism, nobody sleeps without eating, nor should anybody die of hunger.

History 
Pangat and Sangat came together from the time of Guru Nanak Dev Ji, the first Guru of Sikhism. Nanak's father gave him money for trade that he spent on feeding hungry Sadhus. He named this that True Transaction (Sacha Sauda). Where there is Sangat, there is always a Langar (food service). According to Sikh principles all people (Sangat) who sit in pangat share food on equal basis. 

In the history of Sikhism, when Emperor Akbar and the King of Haripur went to meet Guru Amar Das Ji, the third Guru of Sikhism. They both had to eat Langar in the pangat before meeting the Guru.

See also 

 Langar (Sikhism)

References

Cultural assimilation
Sanskrit words and phrases
Sikh practices